Farrer's scallop (Chlamys farreri), also known as the Chinese scallop, is a species of marine bivalve mollusk is the scallop family; Pectinidae.

History of aquaculture 
This species is farmed at an industrial level off mainland China, but production was devastated by a series of epidemics in the 1990s. It is now thought that this die-off was the result of infections with Ostreavirus, a herpes virus in the family Malacoherpesviridae.

References 

Molluscs described in 1776
farreri
Taxa named by Otto Friedrich Müller